Barnson is a surname. Notable people with the surname include:

Matthew Barnson (born 1979), American composer
Murray Barnson Emeneau (1904–2005), American linguist

See also
Barson